Oinonen is a Finnish surname. Notable people with the surname include:

Miikka Oinonen (born 1983), Finnish footballer
Pekka Oinonen (born 1944), Finnish diplomat 
Pentti Oinonen (born 1952), Finnish politician
Voldemar Oinonen (1891–1963), Finnish military commander

Finnish-language surnames